Tadepalligudem railway station (station code:TDD) located in the Indian state of Andhra Pradesh, serves Tadepalligudem in West Godavari district. It is administered under Vijayawada railway division of South Coast Railway zone (formerly South Central Railway zone).

History 
Between 1893 and 1896,  of the East Coast State Railway, between Vijayawada and Cuttack was opened for traffic. The southern part of the West Coast State Railway (from Waltair to Vijayawada) was taken over by Madras Railway in 1901.

Classification 
In terms of earnings and outward passengers handled, Tadepalligudem is categorized as a Non-Suburban Grade-4 (NSG-4) railway station. Based on the re–categorization of Indian Railway stations for the period of 2017–18 and 2022–23, an NSG–4 category station earns between – crore and handles  passengers.
The station is one of the Google Stations available in this division

Passenger lifts are available on both Platform 1 and Platform 2

It is one of the 38 stations in the division to be equipped with Automatic Ticket Vending Machines (ATVMs).

References 

Railway stations in West Godavari district
Vijayawada railway division